Lucky Hank is an American comedy drama television series developed by Paul Lieberstein and Aaron Zelman which is based on the 1997 novel Straight Man by Richard Russo. Starring Bob Odenkirk, the series premiered on March 19, 2023, on AMC.

Synopsis
An English department chairman at an underfunded college, Professor Hank Devereaux toes the line between midlife crisis and full-blown meltdown, navigating the offbeat chaos in his personal and professional life.

Cast

Main
 Bob Odenkirk as William Henry Devereaux, Jr.
 Mireille Enos as Lily Devereaux
 Olivia Scott Welch as Julie
 Diedrich Bader as Tony Conigula
 Sara Amini as Meg Quigley
 Cedric Yarbrough as Paul Rourke
 Suzanne Cryer as Gracie DuBois

Guest
 Alvina August as June Washington-Chen
 Arthur Keng as Teddy Washington-Chen
 Jackson Kelly as Barto Williams-Stevens
 Shannon DeVido as Emma Wheemer
 Oscar Nunez as Dean Rose
 Kyle MacLachlan as Dickie Pope
 Tom Bower
 Chris Diamantopoulos as Tom Loring
 Brian Huskey
 Chris Gethard as Jeffrey
 Nancy Robertson as Billie

Episodes

Development
The series was originally announced to be in development at AMC and Tristar Television in April 2022 under the name of the book it was based on, with Aaron Zelman and Paul Lieberstein as showrunners and Bob Odenkirk as executive producer in addition to starring. Two weeks later, the project had given a series order. It is scheduled to have an eight-episode first season. In January 2023, the series was renamed Lucky Hank, and the first images were released.

Casting 
After Odenkirk’s involvement was announced with the show itself, in August 2022, it was reported that Mireille Enos joined the cast. The following month, she was joined by Olivia Scott Welch, Diedrich Bader, Sara Amini, Cedric Yarbrough and Suzanne Cryer. It was later announced that Alvina August and Arthur Keng would join the cast as married professors, June and Teddy Washington-Chen.

In January 2023, it was announced that Oscar Nunez, Kyle MacLachlan, Tom Bower, and Chris Diamantopoulos would join the cast as guest stars.

Release 
Lucky Hank was announced as part of AMC's spring 2023 programming slate. On January 10, 2023, a specific premiere date of March 19, 2023, was announced. The series had its first screening at the 2023 SXSW Festival on March 11, 2023.

Reception 

The review aggregator website Rotten Tomatoes has reported a 96% approval rating with an average rating of 7.8/10, based on 25 critic reviews. The website's critics consensus reads, "With the fortune of Bob Odenkirk in its favor, Lucky Hank makes ennui essential viewing with a comedy rooted in relatable human behavior". Metacritic, which uses a weighted average, has assigned a score of 70 out of 100 based on 21 critics, indicating "generally favorable reviews".

References

External links 
 
 

2020s American black comedy television series
2023 American television series debuts
AMC (TV channel) original programming
Television series based on American novels
English-language television shows
Television series by Sony Pictures Television